Yang Kui (18 October 1905 – 12 March 1985) or Yō Ki was a prominent writer in Japanese Taiwan. Raised in Japanese-language schools, he went to the Japanese mainland, where he experienced both persecution and acceptance, especially by Japanese communists. Under these influences he became a proletarian novelist. After World War II, he was imprisoned by the Kuomintang government from 1949 to 1961. After being released from prison, he had to learn the Chinese language from his granddaughter , as Japanese had been the common language of Taiwan until the time of his imprisonment.

Life

Early life
Yang Kui was born the child of a tinsmith family. He entered Daimokukō Public School in 1915, having delayed doing so due to health problems. In 1915, Yang was a witness to the Jiaobanian Incident, which changed his view of the Japanese negatively. After graduation from Daimokukō Public School, Yang studied at Tainan No. 2 High School, where he read the literary works of Natsume Sōseki, Akutagawa Ryūnosuke, and  Charles Dickens, as well as works of Russian literature and Revolutionary French literature, including especially Les Miserables by Victor Hugo, which "particularly touched" him due to its description of social conflict.

In 1923, having read the book Taiwan hishi (A Record of Taiwanese Rebels) that went against his experience of the Jiaobanian Incident, Yang began to write to "correct history". He moved to Tokyo in 1924 to escape a proposed marriage to his parents' adoptive daughter and to study social thought. In Tokyo, Yang encountered "proletarian literature", reading leftist magazines and participating in leftist movements. In 1926, Yang founded a cultural studies group and  met avant-garde playwright Sasaki Takamaru, and in 1927, he founded a "Study Meeting for Social Science". He was later arrested for being involved in an anti-Japanese lecture.

Return to Taiwan
Yang returned to Taiwan in 1927, joining the Union of Taiwanese Farmers. In 1928, he was elected to the committee of the Taiwanese Cultural Association, through which in 1929 he met his mentor Lai He. Both organizations were later disbanded in March 1931 by the colonial government in their suppression of Taiwanese communists. With radicalism having been suppressed, Yang began again to write heavily.

Writing
Yang Kui's debut in Japanese literary circles was through his work Jiyū rōdōsha no seikatsu danmen (A Slice of the Life of Free Laborers), which was published in 1927 in the official magazine of the Journalists Association of Tokyo, Gōgai.

In 1932, Yang published his work The Newspaper Boy in Taiwan xinminbao (Taiwan New People's News). It was published in Chinese as Songbaofu. Yang published under the name Yang Kui instead of his original name Yang Gui, having been convinced to do so by Lai He. In 1934, The Newspaper Boy won second prize in the Tokyo leftist magazine Bungaku hyōron.

Yang was influenced by Russian realist literature, Karl Marx's Capital, and Japanese proletarian movements, using them to influence his socialist ideas. He had also been influenced by anarchism, having read Mikhail Bakunin and Peter Kropotkin after the death of Ōsugi Sakae. Yang identified as a "humanitarian socialist", and associated with Japanese socialists and unionists. He defended realism, and believed that literature "had to come from the indigenous soil" instead of being about "the war effort or personal aestheticism".

See also
 Yang Kui Literature Memorial Museum

References

Citations

Bibliography

External links
 "The Indomitable Rose-- The Yang Kui Literary Memorial Hall ," Taiwan Culture Portal, 15 May 2007
 "壓不扁的玫瑰" (The Indomitable Rose) by Yang K'uei
 
 楊逵文學的流變佮伊的意義 (The Significance of Fluctuating Yang Kui's Literature).
 

1905 births
1985 deaths
Taiwanese male novelists
Taiwanese prisoners and detainees
Writers from Tainan
20th-century novelists
20th-century male writers